Simplocaria is a genus of pill beetles in the family Byrrhidae. There are more than 30 described species in Simplocaria.

Species
These 31 species belong to the genus Simplocaria:

 Simplocaria acuminata Erichson, 1847
 Simplocaria arctica Poppius, 1904
 Simplocaria atayal Putz, 2003
 Simplocaria basalis Sahlberg, 1903
 Simplocaria brevistriata Reitter, 1900
 Simplocaria bunun Putz, 2003
 Simplocaria carpathica Hampe, 1853
 Simplocaria columbica Casey
 Simplocaria deubeli Ganglbauer, 1899
 Simplocaria elongata J. Sahlberg, 1903
 Simplocaria hakonensis Takizawa, 1983
 Simplocaria ivani Putz, 2003
 Simplocaria jugicola Baudi, 1889
 Simplocaria macularis Reitter, 1896
 Simplocaria maculosa Erichson, 1847
 Simplocaria metallica (Sturm, 1807)
 Simplocaria montenegrina Obenberger, 1917
 Simplocaria nenkaoshan Putz, 2003
 Simplocaria nivalis Ganglbauer, 1904
 Simplocaria paiwan Putz, 2003
 Simplocaria palmeni Poppius, 1904
 Simplocaria rukai Putz, 2003
 Simplocaria saysiat Putz, 2003
 Simplocaria semistriata (Fabricius, 1801)
 Simplocaria shikokensis Takizawa, 1983
 Simplocaria smetanai Putz, 2003
 Simplocaria striata C.Brisout de Barneville, 1866
 Simplocaria subnuda Casey
 Simplocaria taiwanica Putz, 2003
 Simplocaria taroko Putz, 2003
 Simplocaria tsou Putz, 2003

References

Further reading

External links

 

Byrrhidae
Articles created by Qbugbot